Rhydargaeau is a village in Carmarthenshire, Wales. It lies along the A485 road which connects it to Pontarsais in the north and Peniel and Carmarthen,  to the south. The village is located in the community of Llanllawddog. The village featured in the Welsh television series Pen Talar by S4C. The village pub is the Bluebell and Rhydargaeau also contains a Baptist church and Upper Llawddog Pump House.

Notable people
Esther Lewis (1887–1958), missionary

References

Villages in Carmarthenshire